William Henry Clarence (1856–1879) was King, or Hereditary Chief, of the Miskito. He was educated privately at Kingston, Jamaica. He succeeded on the death of his uncle George Augustus Frederic II, 27 November 1865 and was crowned,  23 May 1866. He reigned under a Council of Regency until he came of age and assumed full ruling powers in 1874. He was poisoned on 5 May 1879, at age 23.

References 

Miskito people
Deaths by poisoning
1856 births
1879 deaths